Peratostega is a genus of moths in the family Geometridae first described by Warren in 1897.

Species
Peratostega deletaria (Moore)
Peratostega indistincta (Moore, 1888)
Peratostega coctata Warren, 1897
Peratostega punctapex Holloway, 1993

References

Geometridae